Children's Letters to God was a Drama Desk Award nominated Off-Broadway musical that was based on the best selling book by Stoo Hample, music by David Evans, and lyrics by Douglas J. Cohen.

Summary
The musical is about five young children who are friends that discuss their beliefs, ambitions, uncertainties, and questions common but paralyzing coming from children. Issues brought up in the musical are holidays, loss of a pet, divorces, sibling rivalry, the struggle of being unathletic, and first love. As in concurrence with the book, the show does not directly address religion, but just asks questions about life.

Original Cast
It was put on at Lamb's Theatre and the production was directed was Stafford Arima, musical staging by Patricia Wilcox, set design by Anna Louizos, light design by Kirk Bookman, sound by Peter Hylenski, costume design by Gail Brassard, and produced by Carolyn Rossi Copeland. The cast consisted of Gerard Canonico, Sara Kapner, Jimmy Dieffenbach, Andrew Zutty, and Libby Jacobson. Allison Fischer was an understudy in the production.

Song List
  Prologue (Company)
 Questions, Questions (Company)
 Thirteen (Brett)
 Arnold (Iris and Company)
 Like Everybody Else (Theo and Company)
 Questions for the Rain (Iris and Company)
 Ants (Kicker)
 A Simple Holiday Song (Company)
 Six Hours As A Princess (Joanna)
 An Only Child (Kicker and Joanna)
 When I Am In Charge (Company)
 Daydreams (Company)
 Kicker Brown (Theo)
 Silly Old Hat (Brett)
 How Come? (Company)
 Star Letters (Iris, Joanna, Theo)
 I Know (Company)
 I Know (reprise) (Company)
 Joanna's Lament (Joanna) (cut from the original performance, but featured on the soundtrack)

Reviews
"Children's Letters to God has a sweet, warm heart, the appealing lyrics of Douglas J. Cohen and the music of David Evans [both Drama Desk nominees], and the innate humor of its source material [by Stuart Hample]." - The New York Times
"Whimsical and charming family-oriented production about the innocent joys and sometimes simple sorrows of growing up." - New York Daily News
"Looking for a show for kids AND adults? This one might be the answer to your prayers!" - WCBS TV
"Clever, funny and musically hip!" - Broadwayworld.com

Awards
The show was nominated for a Drama Desk Award for 'Outstanding Lyrics.

References

Off-Broadway musicals
2004 musicals